Daniel Voytas, Ph.D., is Professor of Genetics, Cell Biology and Development at the University of Minnesota and Director of the Center for Precision Plant Genomics. He is also the Chief Scientific Officer of Calyxt, an agricultural biotechnology company focused on developing crops that provide consumer benefit.

Biography
Dan earned a Ph.D. in genetics from Harvard Medical School under the supervision of Frederick M. Ausubel. His graduate work focused on studying transposable elements in plants. Dan then worked as a postdoctoral fellow at Johns Hopkins with Jef Boeke; his work focused on several retrotransposons in yeast and helped clarify the molecular mechanisms by which retrotransposons select chromosomal integration sites.

In 1992, Dan joined the faculty at Iowa State University. He was promoted to associate professor in 1997 and to Professor in 2001. In 2008, he joined the faculty in the Department of Genetics, Cell Biology and Development at the University of Minnesota.

Dan is best known for his pioneering work to develop methods for precisely altering DNA sequences in living cells, enabling detailed functional analysis of genes and genetic pathways. Dan's work has enabled efficient methods for targeted genome modification of plants using sequence-specific nucleases. Using zinc finger nucleases (ZFNs), TAL effector nucleases (TALEN), and the CRISPR/Cas9 system, Dan has achieved targeted gene knockouts, replacements and insertions in a variety of plant species. This type of targeted genome modification has applications ranging from understanding plant gene function to developing crop plants with new traits of value. His current work is focused on optimizing delivery of nucleases and donor DNA molecules to plant cells to more efficiently achieve targeted genetic alterations.

Recognition 
Dan has co-authored over 100 peer-reviewed publications and holds a number of patents relating to genome editing and plant biotechnology.

Dan is an elected Fellow of the American Association for the Advancement of Science. The use of genetic engineering to modify crop plants was selected as one of MIT's 10 breakthrough technologies for the year 2015.

Selected publications 
 Cermak T, Starker CG, Voytas DF. (2015) Efficient design and assembly of custom TALENs using the Golden Gate platform. Methods Mol Biol. 1239:133-159.
 Gil-Humanes J, Voytas DF. (Sept. 2014) Wheat rescued from fungal disease. Nat Biotechnol. 32(9):886-7.
 Baltes N.J., Gil-Humanes J., Cermak T., Atkins P.A. and Voytas D.F. (2014) DNA Replicons for Plant Genome Engineering. Plant Cell 26: 151-63
 Qi Y., Zhang Y., Zhang F., Baller J.A., Cleland S.C., Ryu Y., Starker C.G. and Voytas D.F. (2013) Increasing frequencies of site-specific mutagenesis and gene targeting in Arabidopsis by manipulating DNA repair pathways. Genome Res. 23: 547-54
 Zhang Y., Zhang F., Li X., Baller J.A., Qi Y., Starker C.G., Bogdanove A.J. and Voytas D.F. (2013) TALENs enable efficient plant genome engineering. Plant Physiol 161: 1-8
 Baller J.A., Gao J. and Voytas D.F. (2011) Access to DNA establishes a secondary target site bias for the yeast retrotransposon Ty5. Proc Natl Acad Sci USA 108: 20351-6
 Baller J.A., Gao J., Stamenova R., Curcio M.J. and Voytas D.F. (2012) A nucleosomal surface defines an integration hotspot for the Saccharomyces cerevisiae Ty1 retrotransposon. Genome Res 22: 704-13
 Cermak T., Doyle E.L., Christian M., Wang L., Zhang Y., Schmidt C., Baller J.A., Somia N.V., Bogdanove A.J. and Voytas D.F. (2011) Efficient design and assembly of custom TALEN and other TAL effector-based constructs for DNA targeting. Nucleic Acids Res 39: e82 Christian, M., Cermak, T., Doyle, E., Schmidt, C., Zhang, F., Hummel, A., Bogdanove, A.J. and Voytas D.F. (2010) Targeting DNA double-strand breaks with TAL effector nucleases. Genetics 186: 757-6

References

External links 
 Calyxt

University of Minnesota faculty
American geneticists
Harvard Medical School alumni
Living people
Year of birth missing (living people)